Maxwell Jeffrey Catto (29 July 1907 – 12 March 1992) was born Mark Finkell in Manchester, England and was an English playwright and novelist.

Writing career
Catto wrote adventure novels and dramas for more than four decades and also wrote under the pseudonym Simon Kent. Ten of his works were adapted for film, the most notable of which was the novel The Killing Frost, which became Carol Reed's 1956 film Trapeze. Although he was a holder of a degree in electrical engineering from Manchester University, Catto began writing novels and plays in the late 1930s. After a stint in the Royal Air Force during World War II, Catto returned to writing fiction. Exotic settings and fast-paced action were the trademarks of his novels, defying categorization into any one genre, instead blending elements of many popular literary styles. Much of his work has been translated into other languages.

Works

Novels under his own name
 River Junk – Arthur Barker, 1937
 The Hairy Man – M. Secker, 1939
 Ginger Charley – M. Secker, 1939
 The Flanagan Boy – Harrap, 1949 (made into the film The Flanagan Boy in 1953)
 The Killing Frost – Heinemann, 1950 (made into the film Trapeze in 1956 and consequently re-published as Trapeze by Landsborough in 1959)
 The Sickle – Heinemann, 1952
 The Mummers – Heinemann, 1953
 A Prize of Gold – Heinemann, 1953 (made into the film A Prize of Gold in 1955)
 Gold In The Sky – Heinemann, 1956, Morrow, 1958
 The Devil at Four O'Clock – Heinemann, 1958, Morrow, 1959 (made into the film The Devil at Four O'Clock in 1961)
 The Melody Of Sex – Heinemann, 1959, Morrow, 1960
 Mister Moses – Morrow, 1961 (made into the film Mister Moses in 1965)
 D-Day In Paradise – Heinemann, 1963, Morrow, 1964
 The Tiger In The Bed – Morrow, 1963
 I Have Friends In Heaven – Heinemann, 1965, Little, Brown, 1966
 Love From Venus – Heinemann, 1965
 Bird On The Wing – Heinemann, 1966
 The Banana Men – Simon & Schuster, 1967
 Murphy's War – Simon & Schuster, 1969 (made into the film Murphy's War in 1971)
 King Oil – Simon & Schuster, 1970
 The Fattest Bank In New Orleans – Heinemann, 1971
 Sam Casanova – Heinemann, 1973, Signet, 1977
 Mister Midas – M. Joseph, 1976
 The Empty Tiger – St. Martin's, 1977

Novels under the pseudonym Simon Kent

 Fleur-de-Lys Court – Heinemann, 1950
 For The Love Of Doc – Heinemann, 1951 (published in the US as The Doctor On Bean Street – Crowell, 1952)
 A Hill in Korea – Hutchinson, 1953 (made into the film A Hill in Korea in 1956)
 Fire Down Below – Hutchinson, 1954 (made into the film Fire Down Below in 1957)
 Ferry to Hong Kong – Hutchinson, 1957 (made into the film Ferry to Hong Kong in 1959)
 The Lions At The Kill – Hutchinson, 1959 (made into the film Seven Thieves in 1960)
 Charlie Gallagher My Love! – Hutchinson, 1960, Macmillan, 1961

References

1907 births
1992 deaths
English short story writers
English thriller writers
20th-century English novelists
20th-century British short story writers